Levashi may refer to the following rural localities in Russia
Levashi, Republic of Dagestan, a selo in the Republic of Dagestan
Levashi, Tyumen Oblast, a selo in Tyumen Oblast